This is a list of all the United States Supreme Court cases from volume 537 of the United States Reports:

External links

2002 in United States case law
2003 in United States case law